Stéphanie of Milly (fl. 1197), was a noblewoman of the Crusades. 

She was the second daughter of Henry of Milly or of Nablus, and first married William Dorel, Lord of Botron, having a daughter with him, Cécile. After his death, she married Hugh III Embriaco, lord of Byblos (Gibelet) around 1179. Hugh died in 1196. 

In 1197 she accompanied an army to besiege Byblos, which had been captured by the Muslims, and bribed a guard to open up the city to them. She seems to have died soon after this. 

With Hugo, Stephanie of Milly had two sons (Guido I Embriaco and Hugo) and two daughters (Plaisance, wife of Bohemond IV of Antioch and Pavie, wife of Garnier l'Aleman and mother of John Aleman).

References

Bibliography

 

Christians of the Crusade of 1197
Women in 12th-century warfare
Nobility of the Kingdom of Jerusalem
Women in war in the Middle East
History of Byblos